Elections for Administrative Committees of hamlets were held in Malta in 2010. The elections were held in eight hamlets on 27 March, with elections in a further eight on 5 June. The March elections were won by the Nationalist Party, however the June elections resulted in a victory for the Labour Party.

March elections

Overview 
Elections were held in March in Bubaqra (Żurrieq), Fleur-de-Lys (Birkirkara), Kappara (San Ġwann), Madliena (Swieqi) and Paceville (St. Julian's), Marsalforn (Żebbuġ), Santa Luċija (Kerċem) and Xlendi (Munxar). In Santa Luċija there was no election because only five candidates ran for election, for a third party, the Association for the Common Purpose. 

A total of ten candidates ran for the Labour Party, 36 candidates for the Nationalist Party and two independents. The Nationalist Party won the March elections with 63% of first count votes. The Labour Party obtained 34% while independent candidates obtained only 3%.

Turnout 
The national turnout for the March elections was 35%. The highest turnout was in Fleur-de-Lys (48%) and the lowest in Xlendi (22%). Other turnouts were the following, 37% in Bubaqra, Kappara, and Madliena, 29% in Marsalforn, and 25% in Paceville.

Results

June elections

Overview 
The June elections were held in Baħar iċ-Ċagħaq (Naxxar), Baħrija (Rabat, Malta), Burmarrad (San Pawl il-Baħar), Gwardamanġa (Pietà, Malta), Ħal Farruġ (Luqa), Swatar (Msida), St. Peters (Żabbar), and Tal-Virtù (Rabat, Malta).

Results

References 

2010
2010 elections in Europe
2010 in Malta
March 2010 events in Europe